"Half-Breed" is a popular song recorded by Cher in 1973.

Cher's version, recorded with instrumental backing by L.A. sessions musicians from the Wrecking Crew, was recorded on May 21, 1973 at Larrabee Sound in Los Angeles. Lyrically, the song describes the life of a girl who faces societal rejection due to having a white father and Cherokee mother. It contains themes of racism and double standards. The song reached number one on the Billboard Hot 100, becoming Cher's second solo number 1 hit in the US. The single was certified Gold in the US for the sales of over 1 million copies.

Song information and story
The 1973 version was the first international release from Cher's album Half-Breed, recorded and intended for the American market. Written and performed by non-Natives, it is a classic "Tragic mulatto" narrative, from a white perspective, of a young woman with a white father and an alleged Cherokee mother. The song offers a scenario in which oppressive whites call her "Indian squaw", and claims that Native Americans did not accept her as one of their own because she was considered white according to "Native law". The lyrics were in error in that the Cherokee (like most prominent Native American tribes) are a matrilineal society, meaning a child born to a Cherokee mother is accepted as Cherokee, no matter the nationality or ethnicity of the father; a child would have to have been born in the opposite situation—to a white (or otherwise non-native) mother by a Cherokee father—to not be recognized as a tribal member. 

The song is written in the key of A minor, with a moderato tempo of 116 beats per minute in common time. Cher's vocals span the notes of F3-A4.

Reception
In 1973, "Half-Breed" topped the United States Billboard Hot 100 for two weeks, becoming Cher's second solo and third overall Number 1 hit, and second Gold certified solo single for the sales of over 1,000,000 copies. It was a Number 1 hit in Canada and New Zealand, and a Top 10 hit in Australia and Quebec, respectively.

Peter Fawthrop wrote that this song has a jingling rhythm and that it is one of the lighter-hearted songs on the album. Rolling Stone recommended it and described Cher's vocals as frantic and the production as supremely commercial.

Live performances
In 1999, after almost 25 years of not performing the song live, Cher performed the song in her Do You Believe? Tour. In 2002, she performed the song 326 times in her Living Proof: The Farewell Tour. In 2018, she performed the song during her Here We Go Again Tour. She performed it in Oceania but it was dropped after the first leg.

Cher performed the song on the following concert tours:
 Do You Believe? Tour (1999–2000)
 The Farewell Tour (2002–2005)
 Cher at the Colosseum (2008–2011)
 Dressed to Kill Tour (2014)
 Classic Cher (2017–2018)
 Here We Go Again Tour (2018)

Music video
The video for "Half-Breed" is a recorded performance of the song on The Sonny & Cher Comedy Hour in 1973, with stereotypical, "Hollywood Indian" imagery. Cher is on a horse, wearing a Bob Mackie imitation of men's regalia: Plains-style warbonnet, a halter top modeled after a hair pipe breastplate, and a glittery loincloth. None of these things have ever been part of Cherokee clothing. Symbols the showrunners believed represented Native Americans—flames surrounding Pacific Northwestern totem poles, also not part of Cherokee culture—are also used as props.

Remix version
In 2002, a special remix medley was created by Dan-O-Rama for a video montage that was used in Cher's Living Proof: The Farewell Tour. The medley contains the videos of "All I Really Want to Do", "Gypsys, Tramps & Thieves", "Half-Breed", and "Dark Lady".

Personnel
According to the AFM contract sheet, excluding Cher’s vocals, the following musicians played on the track.

W.T. Babb - contractor
Al Capps - session leader
Hal Blaine
Al Casey
Gene Cipriano
James Getzoff
Thomas R. Hensley
Donald Peake
Emil Richards
Samuel Boghossian
John Durrill
Jesse Ehrlich
Raymond Kelley
Lou Klass
Jacob Krachmalnick
William Kurasch
Carl LaMagna
Gayle Levant
Leonard Malarsky
Gordon Marron
Gareth Nuttycombe
Reinhold Prass Jr.
Nathan Ross

Charts and certifications

Weekly charts

Year-end charts

All-time charts

Certifications

In popular culture
An African-American female impersonator performs the song onstage in the 1999 film Flawless.
The song appeared in the 2005 film Lords of Dogtown.
In 2012, the character Shania Clemmons of the TV series The New Normal sang this song during a talent show while impersonating Cher.

Covers
Swedish singers Björn Skifs & Blåblus (Blue Swede) made one of the first covers in 1973. It appeared on their album Pinewood Rally and a compilation entitled Björns Bästa (Bjorn's Best).
German singer Joy Fleming recorded a German-language version "Halbblut" as a single in 1973. It peaked in the West German charts at no. 38 in February 1974.
 Orchestra leader Ray Conniff recorded it with his singers in November 1973. It remained unissued until 2009 when it appeared on Ray Conniff: The Singles Collection, Volume 3.
In 1990 it was covered by Shania Twain but it was not released until 2001 on her album The Complete Limelight Sessions.
It was covered by alternative rock band House of Large Sizes.
Electronica artist Peaches covered it for youth radio station Triple J's "Like a Version" segment.
RuPaul covered "Half-Breed" on The RuPaul Show.

References

1973 singles
Billboard Hot 100 number-one singles
Cashbox number-one singles
Cherokee in popular culture
Cher songs
MCA Records singles
Songs against racism and xenophobia
Song recordings produced by Snuff Garrett
Songs about Native Americans
RPM Top Singles number-one singles
Number-one singles in New Zealand